Events from the year 1957 in Taiwan, Republic of China. This year is numbered Minguo 46 according to the official Republic of China calendar.

Incumbents
 President – Chiang Kai-shek
 Vice President – Chen Cheng
 Premier – Yu Hung-Chun
 Vice Premier – Huang Shao-ku

Events

March
 29 March – The opening of National Center of Arts in Taipei.

June
 5 June – The establishment of Far Eastern Air Transport.

Births
 7 January – Yeh Kuang-shih, Minister of Transportation and Communications (2013–2015).
 28 February – Perng Shaw-jiin, Deputy Chairperson of Fair Trade Commission.
 31 March – Tina Pan, member of Legislative Yuan (1993–2002, 2005–2016).
 10 May – Wu Cherng-dean, member of Legislative Yuan (2002–2008).
 7 June – Hou You-yi, Mayor of New Taipei.
 17 June – Han Kuo-yu, Mayor of Kaohsiung.
 2 September – Chiang Wei-ling, Minister of Education (2012–2014).
 7 October – Shyu Jong-shyong, Deputy Secretary-General of Executive Yuan (2015–2016).
 22 December – Tsai Chin, singer.

References

 
Years of the 20th century in Taiwan